History of Scottish may refer to:

 History of Scottish Gaelic
 History of the Scottish culture
 History of the Scottish people
 History of the Scots language